Mikhaylovka is a rural locality (a selo) and the administrative center of Mikhaylovskoye Rural Settlement, Kantemirovsky  District, Voronezh Oblast, Russia. The population was 928 as of 2010. There are 12 streets.

Geography 
Mikhaylovka is located 32 km northwest of Kantemirovka (the district's administrative centre) by road. Shramovka is the nearest rural locality.

References 

Rural localities in Kantemirovsky District